State Highway 133 (SH 133) is a  long north–south byway connecting SH 92 to the south and SH 82 to the north, and travels through the towns of Hotchkiss, Somerset, Redstone, and Carbondale. The road travels right next to the Crystal River, known for whitewater river running.

History

The route was established in the 1920s, when SH 133 began at SH 135 in Bardine and ended at Carbondale. SH 133 was then reroutes from SH 135 at Crested Butte to Carbondale by 1936. The route's south terminus was adjusted back to Bardine in 1939, and a small gap at McClure pass was opened. By 1954, a large section of the route was deleted, leaving only a four-mile (6 km) road near Carbondale. The route was gradually expanded through the late 1950s and early 1960s. The route was entirely paved by 1978.

Major intersections

References

External links

133
Transportation in Gunnison County, Colorado
Transportation in Pitkin County, Colorado
Transportation in Garfield County, Colorado